Indigo is the debut studio album of South Korean rapper RM, released on December 2, 2022, through Big Hit Music. The album marks the rapper's first full-length body of work since Mono (2018) and serves as a documentation or archive of his late twenties. Comprising 10 tracks, it includes appearances by Erykah Badu, Anderson .Paak, Tablo of Epik High, Kim Sa-wol, Paul Blanco, Mahalia, Colde, Youjeen of Cherry Filter, and Park Ji-yoon. The ninth track, "Wild Flower", a collaboration with Youjeen, was released alongside the album as its lead single, together with an accompanying music video.

The album peaked at number two in South Korea; number three in Lithuania, Portugal, and the United States; and number four in Japan. It was certified double platinum by the Korea Music Content Association and has sold over 700,000 copies domestically. It is the highest-charting album by a Korean soloist on the Billboard 200 and has sold over 100,000 units in that territory.

Background 
In June 2022, during BTS' ninth anniversary celebrations, after announcing that the band members would be devoting more attention to individual music projects going forward, RM spoke about dealing with creative burnout and losing his sense of direction following the release of the band's fourth studio album Map of the Soul: 7 (2020) and the single "Dynamite". He explained that the pressure from being part of the K-pop industry, to constantly produce music, had made it difficult for him to grow and mature as an artist, and that he needed time to think and rediscover his musical identity—it had become harder to balance his personal artistic works with the demands of his role in the band. RM additionally said he wanted audiences to get to know the band members, including himself, as separate entities, outside of the BTS collective, and revealed they all had solo music in the works that they were preparing to release. 

During a personal livestream held on Weverse in July, he shared updates about the progress of his own album, stating that it was nearing completion, about "90 percent done", and all that was left was the filming of music videos and additional content to be released alongside the album. He also explained that the music would be very different to 2018's Mono: "If 'Mono' recorded my 2016 to '18, then I think this new album serves as my diary and archive for 2019 to '22."

Release 
On November 10, during Hybe Corporation's annual community briefing on YouTube, CEO Jiwon Park announced that RM would be the third member of BTS—after J-Hope and Jin—to release a solo project, his debut album. RM subsequently posted a series of Instagram stories containing the album's title and release date—Indigo, December 2, 2022—as well as the fact that he had begun working on the album since the beginning of 2019. In a follow-up post on Weverse, he mentioned "working hard on it for the past four years" and that "fun friends" were included, seemingly hinting at collaborations on the album. The official announcement notice from Big Hit Music, posted on the platform shortly afterwards, confirmed collaborations with various artists, but did not publish any names. The cover artwork for the album, "a photo of a blue fabric swatch with the album title bleached in white", was shared by Big Hit later in the day. Two days later, RM unveiled more photos hinting at the overall mood of the album via his social media, first posting a photo of a spacious room with wooden furniture bathed in warm-toned light, followed by an Instagram story of an image with the phrase "the last archive of my twenties" set against a painted blue background. He shared a preview of the album's external packaging via Instagram on November 14, several hours before preorders began.

RM's first official solo release, but third overall after his eponymous mixtape in 2015 and Mono in 2018, Indigo recounts "stories and experiences [he] has gone through, like a diary." The preorder period for the album opened on November 15. Big Hit released an "Identity Film" for the project on November 22. In line with the album's title, the blue-tinted visual featured "a rapidly paced montage of vague images" with the sound of static playing in the background. Descriptive text about the album appeared as the clip progressed: "Record of RM : Indigo. From the colors of nature, human, etc. Documentation of my youth in the moment of independent phase. Sun-bleached record faded like old jeans". The final line of text read: "the last archive of my twenties", before the video "gracefully faded out". Five teaser photos followed the next day and showed RM, dressed in blue denim and all-white outfits, standing and sitting in the same warm-toned, light-filled room from the previously shared mood images. The painting Blue, by the late Korean artist Yun Hyong-keun (whom RM is known to be an admirer of), featured in some of the photos. RM has said that with Indigo he created a collaboration that "transcends boundaries" between music and art. Big Hit revealed the tracklist on November 24. The album comprises 10 songs and includes appearances by Erykah Badu, Anderson .Paak, and Tablo, among others.

Format 
Two editions of the album were made available for purchase. The "Book Edition" was released in traditional CD format and includes a book, postcard, photocard, and poster. The Target and Weverse Shop USA exclusive versions of this edition contained an additional photocard each. The "Postcard Edition" comprises a lyric book, instant photo, User Guide, and scanable QR guide to access the digital version of the album on Hybe's music streaming app, Weverse Albums, and additional digital content exclusive to that platform.

Singles 
The album's ninth track, "Wild Flower", which features vocals by Youjeen of Cherry Filter, was announced as the album's lead single on November 25, 2022. A preview clip for the single's music video was shared via YouTube on November 30. The teaser was nature-based, first showing a "serene field of wheat", followed by "RM walking on a plain and admiring the sunrise", then cutting to an overhead view of the clouds lit up from below "with pockets of lighting", before ending with a wide angle shot of RM standing atop a mountain next to a lone tree as "atmospheric drum and synth beats" played in the background. The full music video premiered simultaneously on YouTube in conjunction with the single's global digital release on December 2—Youjeen does not appear in the video.

"Wild Flower" debuted at number 75 on the week 49 issue of the Circle Digital Chart in South Korea, for the period dated November 27–December 3, 2022, and numbers 4 and 193 on the corresponding issues of the component Download and Streaming charts respectively. It debuted at number 24 on Oricon's Weekly Digital Singles Chart in Japan with 3,046 downloads sold, for the period dated November 28–December 4, 2022. In the United States, the single accrued 4.1 million streams and sold 29,000 downloads in its first tracking week (period dated December 2–8), and went on to debut at number 83 on the Billboard Hot 100 issue dated December 17, earning both RM and Youjeen their first solo entries on the chart. It was also the best-selling song for that period and topped the corresponding issue of the Digital Songs chart. The single debuted at number one on the genre-specific World Digital Song Sales chart, earning RM his fourth number one overall on the ranking.

Dazed listed "Wild Flower" at number 17 on its year-end ranking of the 40 best K-pop songs released in 2022, with music writer Taylor Glasby stating that the song's position on the list was "a testament to [its] powerful and emotive immediacy". She described it as a "beautifully paced, produced and performed snapshot of a superstar's psyche, as fascinating as it is profoundly stirring." The single was later nominated in the Best Music (Winter) category at the 2023 Fact Music Awards.

Promotion 
RM discussed Indigo in in-depth interviews with NME, Variety, and The Atlantic published the day of the album's release. He made his solo performance debut on NPR's Tiny Desk Concert shortly afterwards. The rapper's 3-song set opened with "Seoul" from his Mono (2018) mixtape, followed by the first two tracks from the album: "Yun" and "Still Life". RM is also set to guest on a two-part episode on the Melon Station radio series where he will talk about producing the album, his collaborations, share behind-the-scenes anecdotes, and participate in a Q&A. An exclusive "Ask Me Anything" video will also be released.

A small, commemorative music event was held in Seoul on December 5. Two hundred fans were selected via lottery on Weverse—winners were announced on November 24—from among those who preordered the album, to participate in the event, which was recorded for subsequent promotional video content.

Critical reception 

On Metacritic, which assigns a normalized rating out of 100 to reviews from professional publications, Indigo has received an average score of 87 based on six reviews, indicating "universal acclaim". Consequences Mary Siroky wrote that Indigo "feels like a gift to [RM's] own creative spirit as much as it does a gift to the listeners" and that it "captures something about the human experience, which is that there's room for the kind of bone-deep heartache...alongside the joy." She summarized the album as "a record from a writer at the very top of his game who has proven that he still has so far to go and so much to share", with praise for the way RM expresses his frustrations about a "uniquely isolating chapter of life, the "creative catharsis" and experimentation evident on the album, and its "poignant unraveling of heartbreak and hope." Siroky pinpointed "Still Life", "All Day", and "Wild Flower" as essential tracks from the album. Abbie Aitken highlighted the "sense of growth" and change in perspective present on Indigo in her review for Clash magazine. She described the record as "a more candid representation" of RM" that "presents a vivid accumulation of lessons learnt, artistic prowess and a mature outlook on ageing." She gave it an 8/10 rating, writing that "the inclusion of art combined with the presence of an interpretation of nature...feels calming, relatable and fresh". Aitken also commended RM's "meticulous" choice in collaborators, noting that "each track works within the featured artists confines." She concluded that the album "is a charming look into the mentality of a global superstar."

Rolling Stone India ranked Indigo at number three on its list of the 15 Best Korean Hip-Hop and R&B Albums of 2022. Music writer Divyansha Dongre called the album a "refined manifestation of the perspectives [RM has] meditated on over the past decade." Billboard ranked Indigo at the top of its year-end list of the "25 Best K-pop Albums of 2022", with journalist Jeff Benjamin writing that "RM captured the essence of his twenties in the 10 tracks on Indigo, but this 32-minute journey touches far beyond one person's experience. Like good art, Indigo speaks to ideas and messages that are complicated to put into everyday words, but just listening to the music lets it all come to the surface".

Commercial performance 
Indigo initially charted in Japan with digital sales only. It debuted at number one on Oricon's weekly Digital Albums Chart dated December 12, 2022, with 3,231 copies sold during the tracking period dated November 28–December 4, 2022. Following the release of the physical album in the country on December 10, it entered the weekly Albums Chart issue dated December 19, at number four, with 25,123 sales recorded for the period dated December 5–11.

The album debuted at number 15 in the United States on the Billboard 200 issue dated December 17, 2022, with 31,000 equivalent album units, marking RM's second and highest entry on the chart to date. Of this figure, 10,500 pure copies of the digital album were sold—the physical was not yet available in the country—earning RM his second top-10 entry on the corresponding issue of the Top Album Sales chart, at number 10. He re-entered the Artist 100 chart at number eight, his highest peak on the ranking at the time. Eight of the album's tracks—"Wildflower", "Still Life", "Yun", "Lonely", "All Day", "Hectic", " No.2" and "Forg_tful—simultaneously ranked on the World Digital Song Sales chart, occupying the top eight positions respectively, making RM the fourth artist since the chart's inception—after BTS, Agust D, and J-Hope—to do so. "Still Life", "Yun", and "All Day" occupied the top three of the Rap Digital Song Sales chart while "Closer" topped the R&B and R&B/Hip-Hop Digital Song Sales charts respectively. Following the US release of the physical album on December 16, Indigo peaked at number three on the Billboard 200 chart issue dated December 31, with 83,000 equivalent album units—this included 79,000 pure sales (77,500 physical albums and an additional 1,500 digital albums) and 4,000 streaming equivalent album units (5.3 million streams)—earning RM his first solo top-10 entry and highest peak on the ranking, and making him the highest-charting Korean soloist in Billboard 200 history. He also rose to a new peak on the Artist 100 at number six.

Track listing

Personnel 
Credits adapted from the liner notes of Indigo and listed alphabetically. Excludes vocal, songwriting, and production credits already cited above.

Mastered by Chris Gehringer at Sterling Sound.

 JaRon "Joe Cool" Adkison – record engineering 
 Erykah Badu – background vocals 
 Antwone Barnes – choir 
 Duane Benjamin – choir co-production , choir arrangement/orchestration 
 Paul Blanco – background vocals , record engineering 
 Dedrick Bonner – choir arrangement/orchestration , choir , choir direction 
 Bryce Charles – choir 
 Hye-jin Choi – record engineering 
 Marqell Ward Clayton – choir 
 Colde – record engineering 
 Docskim – piano , synthesizer , bass , programming , string arrangement 
 EAeon – keyboard , synthesizer , record engineering 
 John Eun – piano , acoustic guitar , bass , percussion , vocal and rap arrangement , record engineering , digital editing , mix engineering , electric piano , synthesizer , electric guitar , background vocals 
 Evan – digital editing 
 Ghstloop – keyboard , synthesizer , digital editing 
 Summer Greer – choir 
 Hissnoise – digital editing 
 Honne – keyboard , synthesizer , guitars , drum programming 
 Jaycen Joshua – mix engineering 
Mike Seaberg – mix engineering 
Rachel Blum – assistant 
Jacob Richards – assistant 
DJ Riggins – assistant 
 Onewoo Kang – additional programming 
 David Kim – mix engineering 
 Jongkuk Kim – drums 
 Rob Kinelski – mix engineering 
 Adam Kulling – keyboard , synthesizer 
 Ken Lewis – mix engineering 
 Logikal – keyboard , synthesizer 
 Maiz – digital editing 
 Manny Marroquin – mix engineering 
Zach Pereyra – assistant mix engineering 
Trey Station – assistant mix engineering 
Anthony Vilchis – assistant mix engineering 
 Shin Min – string arrangement , string conducting 
 Sha'leah Nikole – choir 
 Sung-geun Oh – record engineering 
Ye-chan Joo – assistant 
 Ji-yoon Park – background vocals 
 Pdogg – keyboard , synthesizer , drum programming 
 Ililta Pina – choir 
 Erik Reichers – record engineering 
 James F. Reynolds – mix engineering 
 CD Rios – studio assistant 
 RM – vocal and rap arrangement , record engineering , background vocals , percussion 
 Clinton Roane – choir 
 Emily Silva – choir 
 Slowminsteady – guitar 
 Julio Ulloa – record engineering 
 Ga Yang – mix engineering 
 Yong String – string 
 Youjeen – background vocals , vocal and rap arrangement 
 Young – guitars , record engineering 
 Zin – vocal and rap arrangement , record engineering

Charts

Weekly charts

Monthly charts

Year-end charts

Certifications and sales

Release history

Notes

References 

2022 albums
2022 debut albums
Hybe Corporation albums
Korean-language albums